Ajay Barik also known as Michle (born 10 January 1976) is a first-class cricketer who played for Orissa in the Ranji Trophy. He was born in Cuttack, Orissa, India.

Ajay is a right-hand batsman and right-arm medium bowler. He took a hat-trick in the 2001-02 Ranji Trophy playing for Orissa against Assam.

Teams
Ranji Trophy: Orissa

See also
 List of hat-tricks in the Ranji Trophy

References

Odisha cricketers
People from Cuttack
1976 births
Living people
Cricketers from Odisha